Klas Ivar Vilhelm Lestander (18 April 1931 – 13 January 2023) was a Swedish biathlete who won a gold medal at the 1960 Winter Olympics in Squaw Valley. 

Lestander started as a cross-country skier, but he was also an experienced hunter, and thus ended up with biathlon. At the 1960 Olympics he placed 15th out of 30 in skiing, but became the first international competitor to ever hit all 20 targets, and hence won the gold medal. His rival Aleksandr Privalov needed to clear three targets out of five at the last post to win the event, but managed only two, and ended up with a bronze medal. Meanwhile, the fastest skier Victor Arbez hit only 2 targets out of 20, and placed 25th overall.

Next year Lestander finished ninth individually at the World Championships in Umeå and third with the Swedish team. He retired the same year, never winning a Swedish Championship.

Lestander lived all his life in Arjeplog, where a square is named after him. He was a cousin of the forest worker and Left Party Member of Parliament Paul Lestander. His son, Dan Lestander, was an artist and won the snow sculpture contest at the Olympic Arts Festival in Albertville, France, in 1992.

Lestander died at his home in Arjeplog on 13 January 2023, at the age of 91.

References

External links

1931 births
2023 deaths
People from Arjeplog Municipality
Swedish male biathletes
Biathletes at the 1960 Winter Olympics
Olympic biathletes of Sweden
Medalists at the 1960 Winter Olympics
Olympic medalists in biathlon
Olympic gold medalists for Sweden
Biathlon World Championships medalists